Shaozhou or Shao Prefecture (邵州) was a zhou (prefecture) in imperial China centering on modern Shaoyang, Hunan, China. It existed (intermittently) from 636 to 1225.

Geography
The administrative region of Shaozhou in the Tang dynasty falls within modern Shaoyang in southern Hunan on the northern border with Guangxi. It probably includes modern:
Shaoyang
Shaoyang County
Wugang
Xinning County
Longhui County
Xinshao County

References
 

Prefectures of the Tang dynasty
Jinghu South Circuit
Prefectures of Ma Chu
Former prefectures in Hunan